University of Constantine or Constantine University can refer to either of two universities in Algeria:

 Université Constantine 1, formerly the University of Mentouri
 Université Constantine 2, also known as the Université Abdelhamid Mehri de Constantine